Intelsat II F-4 was a communications satellite operated by Intelsat. Launched in 1967 it was operated in geostationary orbit at a longitude of 176 degrees east and later 166 degrees west.

The fourth and last Intelsat II satellite to be launched, Intelsat II F-4 was built by Hughes Aircraft around the HS-303A satellite bus. It carried two transponders, which were powered by body-mounted solar cells generating 85 watts of power.

Intelsat II F-4 was launched atop a Delta E1 rocket flying from Launch Complex 17B at the Cape Canaveral Air Force Station. The launch took place at 00:45:00 UTC on September 28, 1967, with the spacecraft entering a geosynchronous transfer orbit. It fired an SVM-1 apogee motor to place itself into its operational geostationary orbit. The spacecraft was operated at a longitude of 176° east until 1970, before being moved to 166° west. In total the satellite remained in service for around three and a half years.

References

Intelsat satellites
Hughes aircraft
Spacecraft launched in 1967